Lane Village is a small hamlet  southwest of Holmfirth and approximately half a mile southwest of Holme Village on the A6024 Woodhead Road.  It lies on the edge of Holme Moss just inside the Peak District National Park boundary. The rainwater springs seeping from Holme Moss and Kaye Edge provide the source of the River Holme.

The village consists of farmhouses, holiday cottages and some private homes. It has long been associated with the Girl Guides Association by the addition of a small training centre, based in some refurbished buildings.

References

External links

Hamlets in West Yorkshire
Geography of Holmfirth
Holme Valley
Towns and villages of the Peak District